The House at 379 West State Street is a historic Queen Anne revival style house in Trenton, New Jersey.  It was added to the National Register of Historic Places on January 23, 1980.

It currently houses the African American Chamber of Commerce of New Jersey branch.

See also
National Register of Historic Places listings in Mercer County, New Jersey

References

Houses on the National Register of Historic Places in New Jersey
Federal architecture in New Jersey
Houses in Trenton, New Jersey
National Register of Historic Places in Trenton, New Jersey
Queen Anne architecture in New Jersey
New Jersey Register of Historic Places